Magnieu is a commune in the Ain department in eastern France. On 1 January 2019, the former commune of Saint-Champ was merged into Magnieu.

Population

See also
Communes of the Ain department

References

Communes of Ain
Communes nouvelles of Ain
Ain communes articles needing translation from French Wikipedia